White Water Branson is a 13-acre commercial recreational water park located in Branson, in southwestern Missouri. It features a wave pool for swimming, water rides, private poolside cabana rentals, dining and shopping. It is open seasonally from May to September. Admission is per-person per-day with some
package rates.

History
When it opened in 1980, the park was intended to simulate a beachside landing, featuring a wave pool and public and private cabanas. The park has been expanded over the years by incorporating large water rides and retail shopping and eating establishments.

See also
 Herschend Family Entertainment, the corporate parent of White Water Branson

External links
White Water Branson's Official Site

Buildings and structures in Taney County, Missouri
Water parks in Missouri
Tourist attractions in Taney County, Missouri
Herschend Family Entertainment
1980 establishments in Missouri